Vinnytsia Institute of Economics and Social Sciences is a part of the Open International University of Human Development "Ukraine" (OIUHD Ukraine). Founded in 1999, the Institute has eight departments. Located in Vinnytsia, Ukraine.

Resources
Vinnytsia  has classrooms and laboratories, resource rooms (for hearing-impaired students), an assembly hall, a student café, sports halls and gyms.

Its library holds more than 570,00 copies of scientific, educational, methodological literature, fiction books and periodicals. In addition, a branch of Timiriazev research library with its reading hall functions at the institute.

Administration 

 Hamretsky I.S. – Rector of the Institute
 Svitlak I.I. – 1-st Prorector (Vice-Rector) on Academic Activity
 Sokhatsky F.M. – Prorector (Vice-Rector) on Science and International Relations
 Bilyi V.M. – Prorector (Vice-Rector) on general problems and additional services

Social sciences and humanities faculty 

In 2003, the Social Sciences and Humanities faculty was founded at Vinnytsia,  Since then the faculty has trained about 3000 students. 

The faculty has 10 doctors of sciences, professors, 34 candidates of sciences, associate professors.  The faculty members are authors of text-books and methodological manuals recommended by the Ukrainian Ministry of Education and Science, articles and abstracts published in professional journals in Ukraine and abroad.

The faculty offers courses in Law, Psychology, Sociology and Human Health.

Economics and business faculty 

The faculty includes three chairs:

 Economics and Finance chair;
 Management and Administration chair;
 Computer Technologies chair.

The faculty has trained over 6 000 students, who work at state and private enterprises and organizations, some of them work abroad.

Universities in Ukraine
Education in Vinnytsia
Buildings and structures in Vinnytsia
Educational institutions established in 1999
1999 establishments in Ukraine